Maria Osmarina Marina da Silva Vaz de Lima (born Maria Osmarina da Silva; 8 February 1958) is a Brazilian politician and environmentalist who currently serves as Brazil's Minister of the Environment and Climate Change. She is the founder and former spokeswoman for the Sustainability Network Party (REDE). During her political career, Silva served as a senator of the state of Acre between 1995 and 2011 and Minister of the Environment from 2003 to 2008. She ran for president in 2010, 2014 and 2018.

Born in a rubber plantation in Acre, Marina moved to the state capital Rio Branco as a teenager, where she became literate. After graduating high school, she completed her undergraduate degree in history from the Federal University of Acre at 26. She developed an interest in politics and joined Workers' Party (PT), later helping to found the Unified Workers' Central of Acre. She helped Chico Mendes to lead the trade union movement, being elected as councillor of Rio Branco in 1988 for her first mandate in a public office.

Silva was a member of the PT until 2009, and served as a senator before becoming Minister of the Environment in 2003. She ran for president in the 2010 Brazilian elections as the candidate for the Green Party (PV), coming in 3rd with 19% of the first-round vote. In April 2014, Eduardo Campos announced his candidacy for the fall 2014 presidential election, naming Marina Silva as his vice presidential candidate. After Campos's death in a plane crash on August, she was selected to run as the Socialist Party's candidate for the presidency. In the first round of the October 2014 election, she won 21% of the vote (less than many of the opinion polls had predicted), coming in 3rd and failing to advance to the run-off. In the second round, she supported PSDB candidate Aécio Neves over PT incumbent Dilma Rousseff. She again ran for president in the 2018 election, this time as the nominee for the Sustainability Network, and finished 8th place with 1% of the vote.

Silva has won a number of awards from US and international organizations in recognition of her environmental activism. In 1996, Silva won the Goldman Environmental Prize for South & Central America. In 2007, the United Nations Environment Program named her one of the Champions of the Earth and the 2009 Sophie Prize. In December 2014, Marina Silva was elected by the British Financial Times newspaper as one of its Women of the Year. Silva is also a member of Washington, D.C.-based think tank, the Inter-American Dialogue. In 2010, she, along with Cécile Duflot, Monica Frassoni, Elizabeth May and Renate Künast, were named by Foreign Policy magazine to its list of top global thinkers, for taking Green mainstream. In 2012 she was one of eight people chosen to carry the flag for the opening ceremonies of the 2012 London Summer Olympics.

Early life 

Marina Silva was born Maria Osmarina da Silva in the small village of Breu Velho, 70 km outside Rio Branco, Acre. Silva is a descendant of Portuguese and black African ancestors in both her maternal and paternal lines. She was one of eleven children in a community of rubber tappers on the Bagaço rubber tree plantation (Portuguese Seringal Bagaço), in the western state of Acre. Growing up, she survived five bouts of malaria in addition to cases of hepatitis and metal poisoning.

Orphaned at age 16, young Marina moved to the state capital, Rio Branco, to study and receive treatment for hepatitis. She was taken in by nuns in a convent and received a Catholic education. There, she became the first person in her family to learn to read and write. After leaving the convent, she went to work as a housemaid in exchange for lodging. She completed her undergraduate degree in history from the Federal University of Acre at 26 and became increasingly politically active. In 1984 Silva helped create Acre's first workers' union.

She led demonstrations called empates with Chico Mendes to warn against deforestation and the outplacement of forest communities from their traditional locations.

Silva as a Senator 
In 1994, Silva was the first rubber tapper ever elected to the Federal Senate. As a native Amazonian and a senator, she built support for environmental protection of the reserves as well as for social justice and sustainable development in the Amazon region.
Deforestation decreased by 59% from 2004 to 2007, during which she implemented an integrated government policy. It simultaneously fostered sustainable development, favored territorial zoning, and attached greater value to standing forests. It also incorporated elements from international conventions and documents. "All of this demonstrates that, when there is integrated planning and effort, it is truly possible to change the picture," Silva said in a statement to the Embassy of Brazil in London.

Lula's minister 
A member of the Workers' Party, Marina Silva was appointed Environment Minister by Lula in his first term (2003). She remained in office until 2008 and received several criticisms from entrepreneurs (mainly related to agribusiness) on account of delays in granting permits for projects with large environmental impact. In early 2005, however, she stated that she would not give up upon facing challenges even if they were imposed by the government to which she belonged, like the controversy over the São Francisco River Diversion Project, and the building of the BR-163 highway through the rainforest: "I don't admit defeat, just challenges that must be overcome".

Also in 2005, Silva established her main lines of action for the next two years: social participation, sustainable development, creation of a National Environmental System, and an Integrated Environmental Policy. As she said, "Our ministry is new. It's only 13 years old, and it needs to be rebuilt".

In the same year, Silva was confronted by Paulo Adário, coordinator of Greenpeace Brazil, over her environmental actions during her tenure in the ministry. Since her tenure began, Silva, together with the Federal Police, the Brazilian Army and the Federal Highway Police, performed 32 operations against illegal deforestation in the Amazon. However, Adário claims that his organization monitors the Amazon region and that only one such operation was conducted in October 2004, in the town of Itaituba, Pará. According to him, even if the 32 operations had actually been carried out, they would represent only half of what was anticipated in the National Plan to Combat Deforestation.

Resignation 
Silva resigned from the Lula government in May 2008. She was replaced by Carlos Minc. Silva cited "the growing resistance found by our team in important sectors of the government and society" as the reason for her resignation. Tension between her and the rest of the Lula administration increased when President Lula da Silva chose Minister of Strategic Affairs Roberto Mangabeira Unger to coordinate a sustainable development plan for the Amazon, instead of her. She had become increasingly isolated in Lula da Silva's government due to her views against hydroelectric dams, biofuels, and genetically modified crops.

Party switch and 2010 presidential bid 

On 19 August 2009, Silva announced her switch from the Workers' Party to the Green Party, primarily in protest against the environmental policies endorsed by the PT. Confirming the expectations, Marina Silva launched her candidacy to the 2010 election under the Green Party ticket on 16 May 2010 in the city of Nova Iguaçu, state of Rio de Janeiro. Silva said she wanted to be "the first black woman of poor origin" to become president of Brazil.

Since 1996, Silva has been a Pentecostal Christian in the Assemblies of God, the second largest Christian denomination in Brazil after the declining but still mainstream Roman Catholic Church. Nevertheless, during her election campaign, she was criticized by one of the main leaders of the Brazilian Assemblies of God, Pastor Silas Malafaia, after having proposed a referendum on abortion and decriminalization of marijuana. According to Malafaia, Marina Silva should be "more courageous and consistent" in defense of her religious convictions.

In her campaign, Silva defended the "exercise of citizen-based political principles and values", "education for the knowledge society", "economy applied to a sustainable society", "social protection, health, welfare and 3rd generation of social programs", "quality of life and safety for all Brazilians", and "strengthening of culture and diversity".

With her speech against the endemic corruption in Brazil (see A Privataria Tucana and Mensalão scandal), and in favor of sustainable development (with a due consideration to environmental issues), Silva managed to attract the middle class sectors disillusioned with the government of the Fernando Henrique Cardoso's PSDB and dissatisfied with the compensatory social policies of Lula da Silva's administration. As a result, she came to be seen as an alternative.

Marina Silva received strong support among young and highly educated voters. Running on a small-party ticket, she had about 1/20 of the TV time compared to the other two biggest party coalitions. Opinion polls notwithstanding, she received 19.4% of the votes cast. This number far exceeded earlier estimates (more than double), but not enough to join the runoff against Dilma Rousseff or José Serra.

Silva at the 2012 London Summer Olympics 
The participation of Marina Silva as one of the eight invited flag-bearers to carry the Olympic flag at the opening of the 2012 London Summer Olympics, took by surprise the Brazilian government representatives present at the ceremony. In the Brazilian press headlines like "Marina steals Dilma's attention" appeared. Commenting on the event, Aldo Rebelo, Brazilian Sports Minister from the PT, which realised it would likely lose votes to Marina in a presidential contest, said that Silva "always had good relations with the European aristocracy" and that it was the responsibility of the Royal House to choose who would participate in the event. The Olympic Committee said it was aware of Silva's work as an activist in defense of the rainforest, but denied any political motivations regarding the choice. About her participation in the ceremony, Silva compared it to the feeling she got when passing, aged 16, her literacy course: "it was the same kind of happiness."

Sustainability Network 
On 16 February 2013 a new party, Rede Sustentabilidade ("Sustainability Network"), was officially launched in Brasilia. According to its founders, the name to be used at the polls would be simply REDE ("NETWORK").

On 4 October 2013, the Superior Electoral Court blocked the party's creation, there being insufficient signatures to register it. The following day, Marina announced her affiliation to the Brazilian Socialist Party.

2014 presidential bid 

In April 2014, Eduardo Campos announced his name for the October 2014 presidential election, naming Marina Silva as his candidate for vice president.

On Wednesday, 13 August 2014, Campos' private jet, with six others on board, crashed in bad weather as it was preparing to land in the coastal city of Santos, just south of São Paulo. After his death, Silva became the Brazilian Socialist Party's candidate for president of Brazil. Soon after taking the place of Campos in the bid, Marina polled 20% of the votes, 10% more than Campos was polling. She enjoys strong support among young voters and evangelicals, but because of her pro-environmental stance she is largely distrusted by Brazil's powerful agribusiness sector. As an Evangelical Christian, she opposes abortion. On 30 August 2014, Silva generated considerable controversy when she renounced the party's support for same-sex marriage, which was supported by Campos and had been included in the party's manifesto, published a day earlier.

On Sunday, 5 October 2014, Silva received 21% of the vote in the first round of the election, to Rousseff's 41% and Neves's 34%. Although many observers had expected Silva to advance to a second round against Rousseff, Silva ultimately received a much lower share of the vote than most opinion polls had indicated in the lead-up to the election, and did not advance to 26 October run-off. Some days after the election she endorsed Aecio Neves in the run-off against Dilma Rousseff.

2018 Presidential bid
On 4 August 2018, Marina Silva was officially nominated as the Sustainability Network's presidential candidate in the 2018 elections. Silva's running mate was Eduardo Jorge of the Green Party.

Until August 2018, Silva came in third in opinion polls for the presidency, behind Luiz Inácio Lula da Silva (whose candidacy was later barred) and Jair Bolsonaro. However, she was later overtaken by Ciro Gomes, Fernando Haddad, and Geraldo Alckmin, and was later polling fifth on average.

In the last few days before the election, her poll numbers dropped significantly, and in the end she polled around a single percentage point. She came out eight with 1.0% and 1,066,893 votes.

Return as Minister of the Environment
On September 12 2022 in an event open to the press, Silva publicly endorsed former boss Luiz Inácio Lula da Silva for President ahead of October’s general election, stating that it was necessary “to beat Bolsonaro and the evil seeds he is sowing in our society.” Lula in turn vowed to enact a series of environmental proposals presented by Silva if he won the election. The turn of events has been described by commentators as a major step towards reconciliation between Silva and the Workers’ Party. Following Lula’s victory over Bolsonaro in the October 31 runoff, Lula announced Silva’s return as Minister of the Environment on December 29.

Political views
Marina Silva is generally considered to be a centrist and an environmentalist. She is running on an anti-corruption platform. She opposes Brazil's nuclear energy program, and wants to redistribute the nuclear energy funds in order to allocate more money towards solar and wind power. Furthermore, she wants to initiate a national plebiscite on investments in nuclear energy. She is in favor of imposing presidential term limits.

Electoral history

References

External links 

  

1958 births
Living people
Brazilian columnists
Brazilian Christian socialists
Brazilian Ministers of the Environment
Brazilian Pentecostals
Brazilian politicians of African descent
Brazilian politicians of indigenous peoples descent
Brazilian people of Portuguese descent
Brazilian Socialist Party politicians
Brazilian socialists
Candidates for President of Brazil
South American democratic socialists
Members of the Federal Senate (Brazil)
Members of the Chamber of Deputies (Brazil) from São Paulo
Members of the Inter-American Dialogue
Members of the Legislative Assembly of Acre
People from Rio Branco, Acre
Women government ministers of Brazil
Workers' Party (Brazil) politicians
Green Party (Brazil) politicians
Sustainability Network politicians
Brazilian environmentalists
Brazilian women environmentalists
Brazilian women columnists
Female Christian socialists
Shorty Award winners
Goldman Environmental Prize awardees
Federal University of Acre alumni